The Basilica of the Visitation of Our Lady also called Werl Basilica is a Catholic church located in Werl, Germany which was declared a minor basilica in 1953. It is dedicated to the Visitation of Mary.

The church was built in 1904-1906 according to the plans of the chief architect of the diocese of Münster, Wilhelm-Sunder Plaßmann in Neo-Romantic style. The temple houses the pious statue of the Virgin of Werle, also called “Afflictorum Consolatrix” (English: Consolation of the afflicted), dating from the twelfth century. Bishop Karl Joseph Schulte consecrated the church on 24 May 1911. 

Pope Pius X granted the venerated Marian image a canonical coronation on 13 August 1911, executed by Archbishop of Cologne, Cardinal Anton Hubert Fischer and Cardinal Karl Joseph Schulte von Paderborn. The reading of the Pontifical decree and sermon was assigned to the Franciscan bishop of  Nepi—Sutri, Giuseppe Bernardo  Doebbing. 

Pope Pius XII raised her sanctuary to the status of Basilica via another decree Quam Omnes Gentes  and  redeclared the coronation on 16 October 1953, which was notarized by the Grand Chancellor of Apostolic Briefs, Monsignor Gildo Brugnola. 

The Franciscans of Werl since 1848 are the guardians of the pilgrimage church and the Basilica of the Visitation. Its convent rebuilt in the 19th century is next door.

The basilica has been restored several times during the twentieth century and especially in the period 2002 to 2003.

See also

 Roman Catholicism in Germany
 Visitation

References

Basilica churches in Germany
Roman Catholic churches completed in 1906
Roman Catholic churches in North Rhine-Westphalia
1906 establishments in Germany
20th-century Roman Catholic church buildings in Germany